Kuber, (also Kouber or Kuver), was a Bulgar leader who, according to the Miracles of Saint Demetrius, liberated a mixed Bulgar and Byzantine Christian population in the 670s, whose ancestors had been transferred from the Eastern Roman Empire to the Syrmia region in Pannonia by the Avars 60 years earlier. According to a scholarly theory, he was a son of Kubrat, brother of Khan Asparukh and member of the Dulo clan.

Origins 
According to a scholarly theory, first proposed by the Bulgarian historian Vasil Zlatarski, Kuber was the fourth son of Kubrat, the Christian ruler of the Onogur Bulgars in the steppes north of the Black Sea. Kuber's story is continued in the second book of the Miracles of Saint Demetrius. The book is a hagiographic work, written in Thessaloniki in the 680s or 690s. Denis Sinor wrote "The Avar Kaghan entrusted Kuber and his suite with the governing of the descendants of the Christian Byzantine prisoners of war, carried off sixty years ago, who were living mixed with Avars and Bulghars north of the Danube, not far from the former province of Pannonia Sirmiensis." Nevertheless, Kuber's people soon liberated the POWs and led them south to the region of modern North Macedonia. The American historian John Van Antwerp Fine, Jr. writes that, if Zlatarski's theory is correct, Kuber was named for his father, because Kuber and Kubrat are most probably two Greek versions of the same Bulgar name. However, others suggest Kuber is but a reference to Asparukh's own Kubiar branch of Kubrat's Dulo clan where "Kubi-ar" may mean "fair haired". Finally, Croatian researchers have proposed that Kubrat of Onoguria's five sons correspond to the five brothers from White Croatia who took Avaria in 677, whereby Kuber would be Chrobatos (Χρωβάτος).

In Avar Pannonia 

Kuber was the ruler of a mixed population in the Avar Khaganate, including the descendants of the prisoners of war whom the Avars had captured in the Balkan Peninsula and settled around Sirmium. He was made governor by the khagan. Historian Samuel Szádeczky-Kardosswho accepts Kuber's identification as Kubrat's son and thus a scion of the royal Dulo clanwrites that Kuber became governor of that region, because the Khagan wanted to separate him from his Bulgar subjects who had followed him from the Pontic steppes. Kuber's subjects called themselves Sermesianoi, but the Byzantines regarded them "Bulgars". They preserved their Christian traditions, although their ancestors had been taken to the Avar Khaganate about 60 years before Kuber's appointment.

The Sermesianoi did not cease to dream of their return to their ancestors' homes. Taking advantage of his subjects' feelings, Kuber rose up in open rebellion against the Khagan "in our times", according to the Miracles of Saint Demetrius. Modern historians say that Kuber's rebellion occurred in the 670s or early 680s. Around 70,000 Sermesianoi joined him and departed for the Byzantine Empire. The khagan attempted to hinder their migration, but they routed the Avars in five or six battles and crossed the river Danube.

In Byzantine Macedonia 

Kuber and his people moved as far as the region of Thessaloniki. He decided to settle together with the Sermesianoi in a plain and sent his envoy to the Byzantine Emperor, whom the Miracles of Saint Demetrios did not name, to request his permission. The emperor gave his consent and ordered the nearby Slavic tribe of the Dragovites to supply Kuber and his people with food. However, Kuber's people still wanted to go back to their ancestral homes and started to disperse. Fearing of the decline of his power base, Kuber asked the emperor to forbid the Sermesianoi to leave the plain and to confirm Kuber's position as their ruler. His request seems to have been rejected, because he attempted to seize Thessaloniki, taking advantage of a civil war in the city. However, Saint Demetrius unmasked Kuber's agents who tried to open the gates of Thessaloniki, hindering him from entering the city, according to the saint's hagiography.

There is no more information of Kuber's life. Some modern historiansincluding Zlatarski and Cankova-Petkovasay that he established a state in Macedonia which existed in parallel with Khan Asparukh's Bulgarian Empire. They also write that the Byzantine Emperor Justinian II who had subjugated the Slavic tribes around Thessaloniki was ambushed and defeated by the Bulgars from Kuber's state on his return to Constantinople in 689. Asparukh's son, Tervel, cooperated with his "uncles in the region of Thessaloniki" against the Byzantine Emperor Justinian II, according to the inscription on the Madara Rider. The Macedonian archaeologist Ivan Mikulčić, who attributes the treasures found at Vrap and Ersekë to Kuber's people, says that archaeological findings confirm their presence in North Macedonia and eastern Albania.

Honour
Kuber Peak in Tangra Mountains on Livingston Island in the South Shetland Islands, Antarctica is named after Kuber.

References

Sources

Primary sources 

The Chronicle of Theophanes Confessor: Byzantine and Near Eastern History, AD 284–813 (Translated with Introduction and Commentary by Cyril Mango and Roger Scott with the assistance of Geoffrey Greatrex) (2006). Oxford University Press. .

Secondary sources 

 
 

Dulo clan
7th century in Serbia
Rulers in medieval Macedonia
History of Syrmia
Medieval history of Vojvodina
7th-century Bulgarian people
Kutmichevitsa
History of North Macedonia